The golden-winged cacique (Cacicus chrysopterus) is a species of bird in the family Icteridae.
It is found in Argentina, Bolivia, Brazil, Paraguay, and Uruguay.

Its natural habitats are subtropical or tropical moist lowland forests and subtropical or tropical moist montane forests.

References

golden-winged cacique
Birds of the Southern Andean Yungas
Birds of Brazil
Birds of Paraguay
Birds of Uruguay
golden-winged cacique
Taxonomy articles created by Polbot